Uroš Čučković (born 25 April 1990) is a Montenegrin professional water polo player. He was part of the Montenegrin team at the 2016 Summer Olympics, where the team finished in fourth place. He is 6 ft 7 in (201 cm) tall and weighs 227 lb (103 kg).

References

External links
 
 Uroš Čučković - Player Info | Global Sports Archive (GSA)
 UROŠ ČUČKOVIĆ U OGLEDALU: Čovjek je sam odgovoran da u sebi otključa ljubav
 Uros CUCKOVIC | Cercle des Nageurs de Marseille
 Uros CUCKOVIC | Profile | FINA Official
 Uroš Čučković - izjava nakon oporavka
 Uroš Čučković - izjava pred meč sa Kanadom | Meridian Sport
 Uroš Čučković – izjava pred meč sa Kanadom

Montenegrin male water polo players
Living people
1990 births
Olympic water polo players of Montenegro
Water polo players at the 2016 Summer Olympics
Water polo players at the 2020 Summer Olympics
Mediterranean Games medalists in water polo
Mediterranean Games bronze medalists for Montenegro
Competitors at the 2018 Mediterranean Games